Sargocentron punctatissimum is a species of fish related to the squirrelfish.

References

External links
 
 
 

punctatissimum
Fish described in 1829